Barbara Hemphill (died 1858) was an Irish writer of novels.

Life
Hemphill was the youngest child of the absentee clergyman, Patrick Hare, who was nominally responsible for the settlement of Golden, County Tipperary. Hemphill initially published her novels without identifying herself after being encouraged by the antiquary Thomas Crofton Croker.

She married John Hemphill in 1807 and they had five children. The youngest of their children was the first Baron Hemphill. Her 1846 novel Lionel Deerhurst, was edited by the Countess Marguerite Blessington. Hemphill is credited with three novels which she eventually published under her own name. Although it is suspected that there may be other unattributed works.

Hemphill died on 5 May 1858 at 6 Lower Fitzwilliam Street in Dublin.

Works
Lionel Deerhurst, or, Fashionable Life under the Regency, 1846
The Priest's Niece, or, The Heirship of Barnulph, 1855
Freida the Jongleur, 1857

References

1858 deaths
Irish women novelists
Writers from Dublin (city)